Jacques Berthier (10 February 1916 – 6 April 2008) was a French actor. He also produced and directed two films.

Filmography

References

Bibliography
 Goble, Alan. The Complete Index to Literary Sources in Film. Walter de Gruyter, 1999.

External links
 

1916 births
2008 deaths
French male film actors
Male actors from Paris
20th-century French male actors